Lionel Frederick Lee (4 December 1845 - 4 December 1899), served as the Mayor of Colombo in 1887 and  Treasurer of Ceylon in 1899.

Lionel Frederick Lee was born 4 December 1845 in Colombo, British Ceylon, the eldest son of George Lee, the Postmaster General of Ceylon (1844-1860) and Martha née Austin.

He joined the Ceylon Civil Service in 1864, at age nineteen, and was the Superintendent of the Census in 1881 and 1891, whilst acting as Registrar-General. He served as District Judge in Kegalle, Tangalle, Galle, Matara and Jaffna; as Principal Collector of Customs; and Fiscal at Colombo and Kandy.

On 1 August 1868 he married Ellen Annie Norfor (1846-?), the fourth daughter of Robert Wright Norfor (1815-1864), the Commissioner of Stamps, Madras, and Amelia Wilhelmina Boxley, at the Holy Trinity Church St Sebastian Hill, Colombo.

He died on 4 December 1899, at age 54, whilst still serving as Treasurer of Ceylon. His position was filled by Charles Edward Ducat Pennycuick, the Postmaster General of Ceylon.

References

1845 births
1899 deaths
People from Colombo
People from British Ceylon
Sri Lankan people of British descent
Treasurers of Ceylon
Mayors of Colombo